Senaspis is a genus of 14 species of Afrotropical hoverfly from the family Syrphidae, in the order Diptera.

Species
S. apophysata Bezzi, 1915
S. cuprea Macquart, 1842
S. dentipes (Macquart, 1842)
S. dibapha Walker, 1849
S. elliottii Austen, 1909
S. flaviceps Macquart, 1850
S. griseifacies Bezzi, 1908
S. haemorrhoa Gerstaecker, 1871
S. livida (Bezzi, 1912)
S. melanthysana Speiser, 1913
S. nigrita Bigot, 1859
S. pennata (Herve-Bazin, 1914)
S. umbrifera Walker, 1849
S. xanthorrhoea Bezzi, 1912

References

Hoverfly genera
Diptera of Africa
Eristalinae
Taxa named by Pierre-Justin-Marie Macquart